Freedom Lasso is the second album by English rapper Akala, released on 1 October 2007 on Illa State Records.

"Love in my Eyes", featuring a sample with Siouxsie Sioux's voice, is a cover version of the Siouxsie and the Banshees' song "Love in a Void" while "I Don't Know" lifted the guitar riff of the Cure's single "Lullaby".

Upon release, the album was hailed by Metro for its "wittily constructed rhymes", "so bold and brassy".

Track listing

References

2007 albums
Akala (rapper) albums